The 2015 FIBA Asia Under-16 Championship for Women was the qualifying tournament for FIBA Asia at the 2016 FIBA Under-17 World Championship for Women. The tournament was held in Medan, Indonesia from August 2 to 9.

China defeated Japan in the rematch of the last edition's finals, 92–75, en route their third title, while Korea edged Chinese Taipei in the battle for Third Place, 60–52. China, Japan and Korea will represent FIBA Asia at the 2016 FIBA Under-17 World Championship for Women which will be held in Spain.

The championship was divided into two levels: Level I and Level II. The two lowest finishers of Level I met the top two finishers of Level II to determine which teams qualified for the top Level of the 2017 Championship. The losers were relegated to Level II.

Qualifying
Semifinalists of the 2013 FIBA Asia Under-16 Championship for Women:

Qualifying round winners at the 2013 FIBA Asia Under-16 Championship for Women:

Levels:
Level I include teams that won in the qualifying round and the semifinalists of the 2013 championship.
Level II are the other teams including the host country which ranked ninth in 2013.

Draw

According to the tournament's website, here are the twelve (12) teams already confirmed their participation for the competition:

Preliminary round

Level I

Level II

Qualifying round
Winners are promoted to Level I of the 2017 FIBA Asia Under-16 Championship for Women.

Final round
Top three teams qualify to the 2016 FIBA Under-17 World Championship for Women.

Semifinals

Third place game

Final

Final standing

Awards

References

2015
2015 in women's basketball
2015–16 in Asian basketball
International women's basketball competitions hosted by Indonesia
2015 in Indonesian women's sport
2015 in youth sport